Alex Rollo (18 September 1926 – 5 October 2004) was a Scottish football player and manager. Rollo won the Coronation Cup with Celtic, effectively marking Hibs winger Gordon Smith. He also won the Scottish Cup in 1951 and represented the Scottish League.

References

Sources
 Alex Rollo, The Celtic Wiki
 

1926 births
2004 deaths
Scottish footballers
Association football fullbacks
Sportspeople from Dumbarton
Footballers from West Dunbartonshire
Ashfield F.C. players
Celtic F.C. players
Kilmarnock F.C. players
Dumbarton F.C. players
Workington A.F.C. players
Sligo Rovers F.C. players
Scottish Football League players
Scottish Football League representative players
Scottish football managers
Sligo Rovers F.C. managers
English Football League players
League of Ireland players
League of Ireland managers